Retina medical search is a free search engine for doctors or medical students. It is a Google custom search engine and the actual coverage is unknown. It claims to cover credible physician level documents and categorizes them in various ways.

See also
 Google Scholar
 List of academic databases and search engines
 Scirus

External links
 Retina medical  Search website

Online databases